Engelhard is an international Fortune 500 company.

Engelhard may also refer to:

 Engelhard, bishop of Naumburg, Germany
 Engelhard (surname)
 Mount Engelhard, a mountain in the Sunwapta River valley of Jasper National Park
 Engelhard, North Carolina

See also
 Thomas Engelhart
 Engelhardia
 Engelhardt